P.R. Pote Patil Group of Educational Institutes, Amravati, was established by the P. R. Pote Patil Educational Welfare Trust, Amravati, on a 100-acre campus in Amravati. This institute is approved by AICTE New Delhi, and is affiliated to Sant Gadge Baba Amravati University. NAAC Accredited with A Grade. Eminent international guest visit in Techelons, technical fest every year. Free of cost international study tour organised by group for students every year. Highest campus placement in vidarbha region. Every year more than 70+ companies come for the campus recruitment.

Management
 Mentor : Hon. Ramchandraji Pote
 President: Hon. Mr. Pravin R. Pote, Ex State Minister, Maharashtra
 Vice-president: Hon. Mr. Shreyaskumar Patil

Director
 Dr. S. A. Ladhake

Following colleges run under P. R. Pote Patil Group of Educational Institutes, Amravati

P. R. Pote Patil College Of Engineering & Management, Amravati
 Principal, Dr. D. T. Ingole
 Vice Principal, Dr. Mohammad Zuhair

Head Of Department
 Applied Science and Humanities: Prof. H. S. Kulat
 Mechanical Engineering: Dr. P. R. Wadnerkar 
 Computer Science & Engineering: Dr. A. B. Gadicha 
 Electronics & Telecommunication Engineering: Dr. R.D. Ghongade
 Electrical and Power: Prof. D. A. Shahakar (PhD-Pursuing)
 Civil Engineering: Dr. S.S. Saraf
 Master of Business Administration: Prof. S.S.Shah (PhD-Pursuing)
 Master of Computer Application: Prof. A. P. Bhande 
 Head of Corporate Relations: Prof. Monica Upadhyday Jain

P. R. Pote Patil College of Architecture, Amravati
 Principal, Prof. Sarang Holey

P. R. Pote Patil College of Pharmacy, Amravati
 Principal, Dr. Mukund Tawar

P. R. Pote Patil College of Agriculture, Amravati
 Principal, Prof. Pramod D. Deshmukh

P. R. Pote Patil College of Education, Amravati
 Principal, Dr. Anuprita Deshmukh

P. R. Pote Patil Institute & Hospital of Medical Sciences Ayurved, Amravati
 In-charge Principal, Dr. Chaitanya Kawalkar

P. R. Pote Patil International School & Junior College, Amravati
 Principal, Mr. Sachin Durge

Techelons
P.R. Patil Group of Educational Institutes (PRPGEI) has built and maintained a reputation of imparting the right mix of education, experience and ethics that form the basis for achieving success in the modern world. "TECHELONS....Step to pioneer"- Just as energy is the basis of life itself and ideas the source of innovation, so is innovation the vital spark of all human change, improvement and progress. "TECHELONS" provide an opportunity to beautiful minds for creativity and innovation to build knowledge based society with multiple opportunities. The event is organised every year with an objective to provide a platform to budding beautiful minds to exhibit the talent, technical skill to enrich their competency, to lead the world in the knowledge based 21st century. 
College started its technical event called Techelons in Jan 2011.This event was inaugurated by Dr. A.P.J. Abdul Kalam,Dr.Vijay Bhatkar.

In 2012, Techelons was organised from 28 Jan to 31 Jan. It was inaugurated by various dignitaries, including:
 Hon. Rajesh Tope (Minister, Higher Tech. Education. M.S)
 Hon. Rajendra Mulak (Minister of States- Energy, Irrigation. M.S)
 Hon. Dr. Raghunath Mashelkar (Former Director General, CSIR, New Delhi) 
 Hon. Dr. Vijay Bhatkar ("father of the supercomputer")
 Hon. Dr. Dinesh Keskar (vice president of Boeing International)
 Hon. Dr. Kiran Bedi (Ist Lady IPS officer) 
 Hon. Dr. Maninderjeet Singh Bitta (Chairman, All- India Anti Terrorist Front)  
 Hon. Dr. P. M. Khodke (director of MSBTE)
 Hon. Dr. Mohan Khedkar (V.C., SGBAU, Amravati)
 Hon. Atul Kahate (chiefi executive officer of Oracle)
 Hon. Venugopal Dhoot (chairman of Videocon)
 Hon. Suhas Gopinath (chief executive officer and president of Global INC)
 Hon. Sanjeev Bambal (Director of Cognizant) 
 Hon. Sameer Bendre (Head Persistent, Nagpur)
 Hon. Arti Kirloskar (Executive Member, Kirloskar Group, Pune)

From 2013 to till this month May, 2019 following dignitaries invited to the campus in Techelons to guide and mentor students
 Hon. Mohd. Younus, Nobel Prize Winner, founder and chairman of Gramin Bank Bangladesh
 Hon. Chetan Bhagat, writer
 Hon. Anurima Sinha, first female amputee to climb Mount Everest
 Hon. Dr. Narendra Jadhao, member of planning commission of India
 Hon. Dr. Suresh Naik, former group director, ISRO
 Hon. Mr. Sujeet Banarjee, director, Department of Science and Technology government of India
 Hon. Mr. Gaur Gopal Das, International Life Coach, ISKON
 Hon. Dr. Rajendra Singh, Waterman, Nobel Prize winner
 Hon. Mr. Kumar Vishwas, poet and social worker
 Hon. B. K. Shivani, teacher, Brahmakumari's world spiritual university

References 

Sant Gadge Baba Amravati University
Amravati district
Educational institutions established in 2008
2008 establishments in Maharashtra